The Rhyl/Prestatyn Built-up area is an urban area which extends from the coastal town of Rhyl to Prestatyn in Denbighshire, Wales. The area takes part of the county of Denbighshire. The area includes the villages of Meliden and Dyserth. The population was recorded at being 46,267.

According to the 2011 census, the gender makeup of the population was 22,505 male and 23,762 female. The ethnic makeup of the whole urban area was 97% white and 2% Asian. Other ethnic minorities were around 1%. The religious make up of the whole area was:

References

Rhyl
Prestatyn
Geography of Denbighshire
Urban areas of Wales